The Public Works Department of Tamil Nadu is a state government owned authority, and is in charge of public sector works in the State of Tamil Nadu. It is part of the Ministry of Public Works Department, and is entrusted with the construction and maintenance of buildings for most of the government departments and public undertakings, and the construction of bridges, roads, and infrastructure.

The Public Works Department (PWD) is the oldest department in Tamil Nadu, and was founded during British Raj in the 1800s. It became a government body in 1858.

Objective and functions 

The Public Works Department functions under the control of Secretary to 
Government and deals with policy making on all matters concerning the Building organisations and Water Resources Organisation of the State

History 
 This Department is one of the largest Departments in the Tamil Nadu Secretariat. Public Works Department is in-charge of implementing irrigation schemes and constructing buildings for State Government Departments and Government agencies including maintenance of irrigation systems and public buildings.
 For effective implementations of Tamil Nadu Water Resources consolidation Project and to achieve functional specialization, the Public Works Department has been bifurcated as Water Resources Organisation and Building Organisation on 01.10.95

Sub - Departments

Undertakings and bodies

Present Ministers for Public Works 
  E. V. Velu

Former Ministers for Public Works

See also 
 Government of Tamil Nadu
 Tamil Nadu Government's Departments
 Ministry of Social Justice and Empowerment (India)
 Department of Finance (Kerala)
 Central Public Works Department, India

References
 http://www.tn.gov.in/departments/pwd.html
 http://www.tn.gov.in (Official website of Government of Tamil Nadu)

Tamil Nadu state government departments
Government agencies established in 1858
Buildings and structures in Tamil Nadu
State Public Works Departments of India
1858 establishments in India